Ronny Rios (born January 22, 1990) is an American professional boxer. He has held the WBC-NABF super bantamweight title since 2019 and challenged for the WBC super bantamweight title in 2017. and the unified WBA (super) and IBF super bantamweight titles in 2022.

Amateur career
Rios was a very highly decorated amateur boxer. He went on to win a National Golden Gloves and two U.S. National Bantamweight Champions.

Professional career
On February 4, 2012 Ronny knocked out the veteran Jeremy McLaurin at the Phoenix Club in Anaheim, California. On November 21, 2015 Ronny defeated Jayson Velez at the Mandalay Bay Arena in Las Vegas, Nevada to win the WBC Silver Featherweight Championship.

On July 13, 2019, Ronny Rios fought undefeated rising prospect Diego De La Hoya. After a slow start, both fighters let their hands go, and started landing on each other in the second round. In the fourth round, the fight slowed down again. In the sixth round, Rios dropped De La Hoya with a left hook and right uppercut combination. De La Hoya managed to get up, but immediately said something to the referee who decided to wave the fight off.

In his next fight, Rios defeated Hugo Berrio via a fourth-round knockout.

 WBA has ordered next fight to be against Murodjon Akhmadaliev.

Professional boxing record

References

External links

Ronny Rios - Profile, News Archive & Current Rankings at Box.Live

American boxers of Mexican descent
Boxers from California
Super-featherweight boxers
1990 births
Living people
American male boxers
Sportspeople from Santa Ana, California